Stenotatus is an extinct genus of cingulate, belonging to the family Dasypodidae. It lived from the Early to the Late Miocene in South America.

Description

Stenotatus was a small to medium-sized armadillo, not exceeding 4 kilograms in weight. It was similar to other Miocene armadillos, from which it was differentiated by its rather long and narrow muzzle, notably the mandible; it had 9 to 10 teeth, simple and oval-shape, with large spaces between the five first teeth. The legs were longer and more specialized than in some of its relatives such as Prozaedyus. The osteoderms composing its mobile armor had three pronounced longitudinal ridges, and it only had a single caudal row of quite narrow piliferous holes.

Classification

The first fossils of this animal were originally described in 1887 under the name Euphractus patagonicus. In 1891, Ameghino described the species Stenotatus karaikensis. The two species were later placed in synonymy, the type species of Stenotatus becoming Stenotatus patagonicus. Other species later attributed to this genus are S. hesternus, S. ornatus, S. centralis and S. planus, all coming from Miocene terrains of Argentina. Fossils attributed to Stenotatus have also been found in Bolivia and Chile.

Stenotatus is one of the most typical armadillos of the South American Miocene; initially considered similar to the extant genus Euphractus, it was later considered close to the genera Proeutatus and Eutatus. It is however still unclear if those two genera constitute a monophyletic group comprising Stenotatus.

Bibliography
Ameghino, F. 1887. Enumeración sistemática de las especies de mamíferos fósiles coleccionados por Carlos Ameghino en los terrenos eocenos de Patagonia austral y depositados en el Museo La Plata. Boletín del Museo La Plata 1: 1-26.
Ameghino, F. 1891. Mamíferos y aves fósiles argentinas. Especies nuevas, adiciones y correcciones. Revista Argentina de Historia Natural 1 (4): 240-259.
Scillato-Yané, G. J. y Carlini, A. A. 1998. Nuevos Xenarthra del Friasense (Mioceno medio) de Argentina. Studia Geologica Salmanticensia 34: 43-67.
A. G. Kramarz, M. G. Vucetich, A. A. Carlini, M. R. Ciancio, M. A. Abello, C. M. Deschamps, and J. N. Gelfo. 2010. A new mammal fauna at the top of the Gran Barranca sequence and its biochronological significance. In R. H. Madden, A. A. Carlini, M. G. Vucetich, R. F. Kay (eds.), The Paleontology of Gran Barranca: Evolution and Environmental Change through the Middle Cenozoic of Patagonia 264–277

Prehistoric cingulates
Prehistoric placental genera
Miocene xenarthrans
Miocene genus first appearances
Miocene mammals of South America
Miocene genus extinctions
Neogene Argentina
Fossils of Argentina
Neogene Chile
Fossils of Bolivia
Neogene Bolivia
Fossils of Chile
Fossil taxa described in 1891
Taxa named by Florentino Ameghino
Chichinales Formation
Golfo San Jorge Basin
Sarmiento Formation